Arthur Gordon Clough (26 August 1934, Salford, Lancashire – 6 April 1996, London), was an English radio presenter and journalist, primarily known for his work on BBC Radio 4.

Early life
Clough was educated at Bolton School and Magdalen College, Oxford, where he read French and Russian.

He spent his national service monitoring Soviet radio traffic in the Baltic Sea, and joined the BBC Russian Service. He was banned from entering the Soviet Union as an alleged former spy.

Career
In 1968 he entered domestic journalism and then studio presentation, working on The World This Weekend, PM and The World at One. Aided by his fluency in Russian, he moved back to front-line journalism at the time of Mikhail Gorbachev's reforms, making a series of award-winning documentary programmes.

Clough also covered South Africa months after the release of Nelson Mandela, and for a season he presented EuroFile, a magazine programme on BBC Radio 4 concerning European affairs.

He was a question-setter for, and the presenter of, Round Britain Quiz.

Personal life
Clough was married to Carolyn Stafford. They divorced in 1991 but later remarried.

Notes

External links
 BBC Radio 4 programme entitled Tribute to Gordon Clough - Imperial War Museum: Clough's report from Leningrad on food queues and shortages in 1991 and the parallels with the siege of Leningrad, 1941-1942

1934 births
1996 deaths
People educated at Bolton School
Alumni of Magdalen College, Oxford
BBC newsreaders and journalists
BBC World Service people
British radio personalities